Soccer in New South Wales is a popular participation and spectator sport. It is organised and managed on a state level by two separate governing bodies; Football NSW and Northern New South Wales Football which are affiliated at a national level to Football Federation Australia.

New South Wales and the state historically has had a large influence on soccer in Australia. It has the most registered soccer players in the country, with over 457,285 players, and the most teams in the professional A-League competition.

New South Wales has the highest participation of any football playing state in the country, with a total of 7% of the population regularly playing or watching the sport.

National Representation

Current top level teams
Five of the twelve teams in the A-League are based in New South Wales: Western Sydney Wanderers, Sydney FC, Macarthur FC, Newcastle Jets and Central Coast Mariners.

NSW is represented in the national women's W-League by Newcastle Jets, Sydney FC and Western Sydney Wanderers associated women's teams.  Central Coast Mariners also had a team in the W-League between 2008–2010.

New South Wales sends teams to the annual national youth competitions in the form of New South Wales Metropolitan and New South Wales Country (run by Football NSW) and Northern New South Wales (run by Northern NSW Football).

Defunct National Soccer League
New South Wales had many different teams in the NSL over the years.  NSW usually had at least the first or second most clubs in the league and also got many premierships over the years. There is a list below of clubs from NSW that participated in the NSL and are still running today in NSW competitions.
A.P.I.A. Leichhardt Tigers
Blacktown City Demons
Canterbury-Marrickville
Marconi Stallions
Newcastle Rosebud United
Parramatta Eagles
St George Saints
Sydney Olympic
Sydney United
Wollongong Wolves

Football NSW Competitions

In the main the Youth and Senior competitions are divided into two sections: Club or Amateur 
Soccer which is run by each association, and Representative or Semi-Pro soccer which is run by Football NSW.

In 2008 there was a major restructuring of the New South Wales Men's, Women's and Youth competitions. The youth teams were restructured to be aligned with their Senior Clubs. The Men's Senior competitions was restructured to add new teams to the NSW Premier League and a new promotion/relegation system was introduced.

In 2019 this system was again restructured, this time separating the Youth and Senior clubs from each other. This allowed Senior results to only affect the Senior portion of a club, and not the youth portion (e.g. if a first grade team was relegated to NPL 2, their youth would remain in their current league and not be relegated as well).

Youth/Senior - Amateur
These are the branches and associations that make up all of Football NSW's youth and senior, women and men Amateur competitions around the state. Each of the associations run their own competitions for various age groups.

16 of the associations also have teams in the Metropolitan League (11s & 12s boys). Some also act as feeder associations or give their backing to certain semi-pro or Representative clubs.

Associations
Bankstown District Amateur Football Association
Blacktown & District Soccer Football Inc.
Canterbury District Soccer Football Association
Central Coast Football
Eastern Suburbs Football Association
Gladesville-Hornsby Football Association
Granville & Districts Soccer Football Association
Hills Football Association
Northern Suburbs Football Association (formerly Ku-Ring-Gai & District Soccer Association)
Macarthur Districts Soccer Football Association
Manly Warringah Football Association
Nepean Football Association
North West Sydney Women's Football
Football South Coast 
Southern Districts Soccer Football Association
St George Football Association Inc
Sutherland Shire Junior SFA Inc.
Sydney Amateur Football League Inc.

Branches

Football Riverina
Albury Wodonga Football Association
Wagga Wagga Football Association
Griffith & District Amateur Football Association
South West Slopes Football Association

Southern NSW Soccer
Controlling Body - Football NSW Southern Branch 
Eurobodalla Football Association
Far South Coast Football Association
Highlands Soccer Association Inc.
Shoalhaven District Football Association Inc.
Southern Tablelands Football Association

Western NSW Football
Bathurst District Football Association
Dubbo & District Football Association
Lachlan Amateur Soccer Association
Lithgow District Football Association
Orange Football Association
Western Plains Soccer Association

Youth - Representative
The Youth Men's Representative system which is run by Football NSW caters for the ages between 11 and 18. It is divided into 3 main leagues.

The representative Youth leagues are seen as the best soccer a youth player can get in New South Wales. The Association Youth League is the third-strongest in the state, the National Premier Leagues Youth 2 is the second - strongest, and the National Premier Leagues Youth 1 is the strongest league of youth football in NSW, as well as the most prestigious.

For the Association Youth League (AYL), there is no relegation or promotion. However, there is a relegation/promotion system between  the NSW National Premier Leagues Youth 1 and 2, which branches off the competition structure:

Before the beginning of each National Premier Leagues Youth season, Football NSW creates a Blue and White group in NPL Youth 1, 
and NPL Youth 2 (each group composed of 12 teams) for the first half of the competition. These groups are made based on each clubs’ success across the Under 14s to Under 18s age groups in the previous season.

For the first half of the season, each club plays against every club in their respective group once (11 rounds). Whilst the rounds progress, each of the points that each age group earn are added to a Club Championship table. Although each age group has their own ladder for the first half of the competition, the Club Championship table ultimately determines the second half of the season for each club.

At the end of the first 11 rounds (the completion of the first half of the season), each age group’s final point tally is added with their other age groups in the club to make an overall point total for the club (this is the club championship). The top six teams from each group in National Premier Leagues Youth 1 based on the Club Championship combine to produce a National Premier Leagues 1.1, and the bottom six combine from each group to produce a National Premier Leagues 1.2. The same applies for National Premier League 2 to produce a 2.1 group and 2.2.

In the second half of the season, the 1.1, 1.2, 2.1, and 2.2 teams again play against each other club in their group once (a further 11 rounds where they again verse 5 clubs from their original groups and a new 6 from the other group).

At the end of the 11 rounds (22 overall), the top 5 teams in each age group’s ladder in the 1.1 and 2.1 tiers play a finals series to determine the champion for National Premier Leagues Youth 1 and 2 in their age group. Meanwhile, a new Club Championship for the second half of the season determines which clubs get relegated and promoted from 1.2 and 2.1. The top 3 clubs from NPL Youth 2.1 in terms of club championship are promoted to National Premier Leagues Youth 1 for the next season, and the bottom  3 teams in terms of club championship in NPL Youth 1.2 are relegated to National Premier Leagues Youth 2 for the next season.

Football NSW Senior Leagues
These are the Senior Men's and Women's competitions. Many of the Senior Men's competitions below are semi-professional.

Senior Men's
All Senior Men's teams are linked with their counterparts of Under 20s, Under 18s and all Open Age competitors.

Top New South Wales competitions:

National Premier Leagues NSW (16 Teams)Premier League
NSW League One (16 Teams)Super League
NSW League Two (15 Teams)Division One

Senior Women's
Both Women's leagues comprise 1st Grade, Reserve Grade, U17, U15 and U14. Football NSW Senior Women's Competitions (in descending order in terms of significance)
 National Premier Leagues NSW Women’s (12 Teams)
 NSW League One Women's (12 Teams)

Northern NSW Competitions

National Premier Leagues Northern NSW
The National Premier Leagues Northern NSW which is made of 8 teams from the Newcastle and Hunter Valley areas is the premier Northern NSW League.

North Coast Football
North Coast Football is a league extending from Iluka to Macksville with over 5000 registered players. It contains the two largest clubs on the north coast of NSW, Woolgoolga F.C. and Northern Storm F.C. (each with over 400 registered players).

Northern Inland Football
Northern Inland Football is a soccer association based in the Northern Inland region of New South Wales extending from Quirindi in the South to Tenterfield in the North

Other Leagues
Other leagues which are supervised by Northern New South Wales Football include Hunter Valley Football, Macquarie Football, Newcastle Football,  Football Mid North Coast and Football Far North Coast.

Cup Competitions
Following is an incomplete list of Cup competitions in New South Wales.

The Waratah Cup
The Waratah Cup is a statewide knockout competition open to men's teams from the NSW Premier, Super, Division 1 and Conference Leagues as well as local Association men's teams. Since 2014 preliminary rounds have been used to determine the NSW entrants to the national FFA Cup knockout competition.

Johnny Warren Cup
The Johnny Warren Cup is the pre-season tournament for the NSW Premier League. The teams are divided into two pools with the winner of each pool contesting the final

The State Robertson & Cullinan Cups
The SRC Cups competition is open to Association club teams. The following age categories have cup competitions:
Male 12-14-16-18-21-All Age & O35
Female 12-14-16-18 & All Age.

Baulkham Hills Kookaburra's are defending champions after taking the title in a close affair in 2007. An extra time winner sealing the victory. Although Baulkham Hills were lucky to finish the match with 11 men after their right back was lucky to escape a second yellow.

Harry Williams Cup
Named after Harry Williams, the former Socceroo and only indigenous man to represent Australia at the World Cup, The Harry Williams Cup aims to unearth Australia’s next crop of indigenous soccer stars with a four-day tournament open to Boys in the Under 12, 14 and 16 age categories. The Indigenous teams play against school and association based club sides with all indigenous sides accommodated during the tournament on-site.

Frank Broughton Cup
The Frank Broughton Cup is open to Grade 11 Association Representative teams and Invitees

Centenary Cup
The Centenary Cup is open to Grade 12 Association Representative teams and Invitees

Champion of Champions
The Champion of Champions tournament is an annual tournament run throughout late September and October. The champion side from each association's division 1 in each age group is entered in a cup competition to determine an overall amateur champion for the year within the state.

NSWIS

The NSW Institute of Sport (NSWIS), located at Sydney Olympic Park, operates men's and women's soccer programs. The men's program is aimed at identifying and nurturing talented 15- and 16-year-olds across the state, while the women's program is an individual skills based program for identified U20 and Senior athletes.

See also
 History of soccer in Newcastle, New South Wales

References

External links
Football NSW
Northern NSW Football

 
New